Iraq participated in the 1982 Asian Games in Delhi, India on November 19 to December 4, 1982. Iraq finished eleventh in total medals table.

References

Nations at the 1982 Asian Games
1982
Asian Games